Moldava may refer to:

Moldava (Teplice District), a municipality and village in the Czech Republic
Moldava nad Bodvou, a town in Slovakia
Vltava, a river known in Spanish as Moldava

See also
Moldova, a country in Europe
Moldavia, a historical region in Europe
Moldova (disambiguation)
Moldau (disambiguation)